Tom Stienstra (born 1954 or 1955) is an American author, outdoorsman and columnist for the San Francisco Chronicle. He produces a radio feature for KCBS in San Francisco, and hosted and co-produced a television special for PBS on the Tuolumne River. He has written several guide books for California, the Pacific Northwest and America. He has  won several awards from the Outdoor Writers Association of America.

Early life
Stienstra grew up in Palo Alto, California, where he graduated from Palo Alto High School in 1972. He received his degree in journalism from San Jose State University.

Career
Stienstra published his first story at age 8, "Searching for a Lost Friend", in the Palo Alto Times. After earning his degree, he became a sports reporter there. In 1979, when the Palo Alto Times merged with the Redwood City Tribune and became the Peninsula Times Tribune, he was promoted to sports columnist. In 1980, he was hired to write about the outdoors for the San Francisco Examiner, which at the time operated jointly with the Chronicle.

Since 2000, he has produced and broadcast a radio feature for KCBS in San Francisco, and appears frequently as a live guest expert. He hosted the TV show The Great Outdoors for CBS-CW networks and in 2017 hosted and co-produced with Jim Schlosser a national PBS special, The Mighty T -- The Tuolumne River, from Glacier to Golden Gate.

Books
Stienstra has written many books, including many No. 1 bestsellers in their categories. Among them, Moon California Camping was released in its 22th edition in spring 2022, and Moon Pacific Northwest Camping, was listed in the Portland Oregonian as a No. 1 bestseller. 

In 2012 he published a novel, The Sweet Redemption, An Inspector Korg Mystery.

Awards
Stienstra's film on the Tuolumne won the 2017 Northern California Area Emmy Award for Health / Science / Environmental Special.

In 2022, his book 52 Weekend Adventures was awarded second place as best outdoor book of the year by the Outdoor Writers Association of America (OWAA).

Stienstra is one of the OWAA's most awarded members. In 2015, he became the first four-time winner of its President's Award as "Best of the Best", when he won best story of the year in the Newspaper/Website division. The winning entry was "Paddling with giants", published in the San Francisco Chronicle on August 5, 2014. To become a finalist for the President's Award, that story won first place in the Outdoor Fun and Adventure Category of the Newspaper/Website Contest. In 2017, when he won the President's Award for best outdoors television show for his PBS special on the Tuolumne, he was the only member to win simultaneous first-place awards in newspaper, radio and television. In 2018, he won 1st Place, Outdoor Recreation Photo of the Year for "A world apart on the marsh". He won the association's highest award, the Enduring Excellence Award, in 2021, the first writer from California to do so.

Stienstra was the fourth living member inducted into the California Outdoors Hall of Fame.

Personal life
Stienstra survived a hatchet attack when he was 21, which gave him insights into post-traumatic stress disorder as well as the healing and fulfillment of being in the outdoors.

In 2015, he married Denese Stienstra, with whom he has two stepsons; they live in Siskiyou County. In August 2021 he was diagnosed with metastasized melanoma and underwent brain surgery.

References

External links
 Official website

American male writers
1950s births
Living people
San Jose State University alumni